Cochylis formonana is a species of moth of the family Tortricidae. It is found in the United States, where it has been recorded from California.

Adults have been recorded on wing in March and July.

References

Moths described in 1907
Cochylis